The Afroasiatic Urheimat is the hypothetical place where speakers of the proto-Afroasiatic language lived in a single linguistic community, or complex of communities, before this original language dispersed geographically and divided into separate distinct languages. This speech area is known as the Urheimat ("original homeland" in German). Afroasiatic languages are today mostly distributed in parts of Africa, and Western Asia.

The contemporary Afroasiatic languages are spoken in West Asia, North Africa, the Horn of Africa, parts of the Sahara and Sahel, and Malta. The various hypotheses for the Afroasiatic Urheimat are distributed throughout this territory; that is, it is generally assumed that proto-Afroasiatic was spoken in some region where Afroasiatic languages are still spoken today. However, there is argument as to which part of the contemporary Afroasiatic speech area corresponds with the original homeland. The majority of scholars today contend that Afroasiatic languages arose somewhere in Northeast Africa.

Date of Afroasiatic
The earliest written evidence of an Afroasiatic language is an Ancient Egyptian inscription dated c. 3400 BC (5,400 years ago). Symbols on Gerzean pottery resembling Egyptian hieroglyphs date back to c. 4000 BC, suggesting a still earlier possible date. This gives us a minimum date for the age of Afroasiatic. However, Ancient Egyptian is highly divergent from proto-Afroasiatic (Trombetti 1905: 1–2), and considerable time must have elapsed in between them. Estimates of the date at which the proto-Afroasiatic language was spoken vary widely. They fall within a range between approximately 7500 BC (9,500 years ago) and approximately 16,000 BC (18,000 years ago). According to Igor M. Diakonoff (1988: 33n), proto-Afroasiatic was spoken  10,000 BC. According to Christopher Ehret (2002: 35–36), proto-Afroasiatic was spoken c. 11,000 BC at the latest, and possibly as early as c. 16,000 BC.  These dates are older than dates associated with most other protolanguages.

Urheimat hypotheses

Levant theory
Supporters of a non-African origin for Afroasiatic are particularly common among those with a background in Semitic or Egyptological studies, amongst archaeological proponents of the "farming/language dispersal hypothesis" according to which major language groups dispersed with early farming technology in the Neolithic. The leading linguistic proponent of this idea in recent times is Alexander Militarev. Arguments for and against this position depend upon the contested proposal that farming-related words can be reconstructed in Proto-Afroasiatic, with farming technology being widely thought to have spread from the Levant into North Africa.

Militarev, who linked proto-Afroasiatic to the Levantine Natufian culture, that preceded the spread of farming technology, believes the language family to be about 10,000 years old. He wrote (Militarev 2002, p. 135) that the "Proto-Afrasian language, on the verge of a split into daughter languages", meaning, in his scenario, into "Cushitic, Omotic, Egyptian, Semitic and Chadic-Berber", "should be roughly dated to the ninth millennium BC". But an Asiatic origin need not be associated exclusively with the migration of agricultural populations: according to linguists, words for dog (an Asian domesticate) reconstruct to Proto-Afroasiatic as well as words for bow and arrow, which according to some archaeologists spread rapidly across North Africa once they were introduced to North Africa from the Near East, viz. Ounan points. The farming/language dispersal hypothesis does not account for the domestication of plants endemic to the Horn of Africa such as teff, ensete, and niger seed, nor does it account for the lack of evidence for intrusive agricultural populations or the cultivation of wheat, barley, or sorghum there prior to 3000 CE

Northeast Africa theory
Northeast Africa has been proposed by the majority of linguists as the origin of the language group because it includes the majority of the diversity of the Afroasiatic language family and has very diverse groups in close geographic proximity, sometimes considered a telltale sign for a linguistic geographic origin. Within this hypothesis there are competing variants.

Red Sea coast
Christopher Ehret has proposed the western Red Sea coast from Eritrea to southeastern Egypt. While Ehret disputes Militarev's proposal that Proto-Afroasiatic shows signs of a common farming lexicon, he suggests that early Afroasiatic languages were involved in the even earlier development of intensive food collection in the areas of Ethiopia and Sudan. In other words, he proposes an even older age for Afroasiatic than Militarev, at least 15,000 years old and possibly older, and believes farming lexicon can only be reconstructed for branches of Afroasiatic. Ehret argues that Proto-Afroasiatic speakers in Northeast Africa developed subsistence patterns of intensive plant collection and pastoralism, giving the population an economic advantage which impelled the expansion of the Afroasiatic languages. He suggests that a Proto-Semitic or Proto-Semito-Berber-speaking population migrated from Northeast Africa to the Levant during the late Paleolithic and eventually gave rise to the Natufian culture and Semitic languages. It is argued, the appearance of linguistic terms such as dog, bow, and arrow in Proto-Afroasiatic makes a date earlier than 9500 BC (coinciding with the end of the Younger Dryas) highly unlikely since dogs only appear at the earliest in the archaeological record after 12,000 BC in the Near East, and arrowheads only appear after 9500 BC in North Africa and the Horn of Africa as a result of introduction from the Near East. However, microlithic arrowheads appear in southern Africa (71,000 BP) and possibly the Aterian culture of North Africa (ca. 100,000–25,000 BP) suggesting that arrowheads may have been an invention originating in Africa and taken into the Near East by a pre-Afroasiatic late glacial migration. At the site of Nataruk in Turkana County, Kenya, obsidian bladelets found embedded in a skull and within the thoracic cavity of another skeleton dated to ca. 10,000 BP, may suggest the use of stone-tipped arrows as weapons. After the end of the last glacial period, use of the bow seems to have spread to every inhabited continent, including the New World, except for Australia.

In the next phase, unlike many other authors Ehret proposed an initial split between northern, southern and Omotic. The northern group includes Semitic, Egyptian and Berber (agreeing with others such as Diakonoff). He proposed that Chadic stems from Berber (some other authors group it with southern Afroasiatic languages such as Cushitic ones).

Ethiopia
Roger Blench has proposed southwestern Ethiopia, in or around the Omo Valley, citing the high internal diversification of the Omotic branch and the lack of evidence that Omotic-speaking groups migrated to this region from elsewhere. Compared to Militarev and Ehret he proposed a relatively young time-depth of approximately 10,000 years. Like Ehret he accepts that Omotic is Afroasiatic and sees the split of northern languages from Omotic as an important early development.

Sahel/Sahara 
Igor Diakonoff proposed the Eastern Sahara  region, specifically the southern fringe of the Sahara.

Lionel Bender proposed the area near Khartoum, Sudan, at the confluence of the Blue Nile and White Nile. The details of his theory are widely cited but controversial, as it involves the proposal that Semitic originated in Ethiopia and crossed to Asia directly from there over the Red Sea. This could also potentially solidify Bender's argument, in that scholars today believe that there is a relationship between the Cushitic branch and the Chadic Branch; arguing that perhaps Chadic descends from Cushitic.

Evidence from population genetics

The most commonly cited genetic marker in recent decades has been the Y chromosome, which is passed from father to son along paternal lines in un-mixed form, and therefore gives a relatively clear definition of one human line of descent from common ancestors. There is a high frequency of haplogroups J1 and E1b1b in select Afro-Asiatic speakers.

Several branches of humanity's Y-DNA family tree have been proposed as having an association with the spread of Afroasiatic languages.

1. Haplogroup E1b1b is thought to have originated in Northeast Africa and to have migrated out of Africa in the Mesolithic. In general, Afroasiatic speaking populations have relatively high frequencies of this haplogroup, with the notable exception of Chadic speaking populations. Christopher Ehret and Shomarka Keita have suggested that the geography of the E1b1b lineage coincides with the distribution of Afroasiatic languages.

2. Haplogroup J1c3 (Y-DNA), previously known as "J1e", is actually a more common paternal lineage than E1b1b in most Semitic speaking populations, but this is associated with Middle Eastern origins and has apparently been spread from there after the original dispersion of Afroasiatic.

3. Haplogroup R1b1a (R-V88), and specifically its sub-clade R-V69, has a very strong relationship with Chadic speaking populations, who unlike other Afroasiatic speakers have low frequencies of Haplogroup E1b1b and J1. The majority of R-V88 was found in northern and central Africa, in Chadic-speaking populations. It is less common in neighbouring populations. The authors also found evidence of high concentration in Western Egypt and evidence that the closest related types of R1b are found in the Middle East, Levant, and to a lesser extent southern Europe. They proposed that an Eastern Saharan origin for Chadic R1b would agree with linguistic theories such as those of Christopher Ehret, that Chadic and Berber form a related group within Afroasiatic, which originated in the area of the Sahara. R1b-V88 had probably entered Africa from Western Asia, via Egypt, and moved south along the Nile river and eventually crossing over to West Africa between 9,200 and 5,600 years ago.

In contrast to the evidence from paternally inherited Y-DNA, a recent study has shown that a branch of mitochondrial haplogroup L3 links the maternal ancestry of Chadic-speakers from the Sahel with Cushitic-speakers from the Horn of Africa.

Other mitochondrial lineages that are associated with Afroasiatic include mitochondrial haplogroups M1 and haplogroup U6. Gonzalez et al. 2007 suggest that Afroasiatic speakers may have dispersed from the Horn of Africa carrying the subclades M1a and U6a1.

According to an autosomal DNA study by Hodgson et al. (2014), the Afroasiatic languages were likely spread across Africa and the Near East by an ancestral population(s) carrying a newly identified non-African genetic component, which the researchers dub the "Ethio-Somali". This genetic component is prevalent among modern Afroasiatic-speaking populations, found at its highest levels among those in the Horn of Africa. It is most closely related to the Maghrebi non-African genetic component and is believed to have diverged from all other non-African ancestries at least 23,000 years ago. On this basis, the researchers suggest that the original Ethio-Somali carrying population(s) probably arrived in the pre-agricultural period (12–23 ka) from the Near East, having crossed over into northeast Africa via the Sinai Peninsula and then split into two, with one branch continuing west across North Africa and the other heading south into the HOA. They suggest that a descendant population migrated back to the Levant prior to 4000 BC and developed the Semitic branch of Afroasiatic. Later migration from Arabia into the HOA beginning around 3 ka would explain the origin of the Ethiosemitic languages at this time. A related hypothesis suggesting the ancestors of Afroasiatic speakers could have been a population originating in the Near East that migrated to Northeast Africa during the Late Palaeolithic with a subset later moving back to the Near East was put forward by Daniel McCall in 1998.

Nostratic hypothesis
The Nostratic language family is a proposed macrofamily grouping together a number of language families including Indo-European, Uralic, Altaic, and even more controversially Afroasiatic. Following Pedersen, Illich-Svitych, and Dolgopolsky, most advocates of the theory have included Afroasiatic in Nostratic, though criticisms by Joseph Greenberg and others from the late 1980s onward suggested a reassessment of this position.

Ilya Yabonovich and other linguists, in examining the differences between the various members of the Afroasiatic family, have realised that all of the old etymologies for this group were inherently semitocentric. The differences between Chadic, Omotic, Cushitic and Semitic, were wider than those seen between any members of the Indo-European family and as wide as some of the differences seen within and between separate language families, for example, Indo-European and Altaic.  Certainly the exclusion of Afroasiatic from the controversial Nostratic family has simplified matters of phonemics, not having to include the complex patterns seen in Afroasiatic languages.

Allan Bomhard (1994) retains Afroasiatic within Nostratic, despite his admission that Proto–Afroasiatic is very different from the other members of the proposed linguistic Nostratic superfamily. As a result, he suggests it was probably the first language to have split from the Nostratic linguistic superfamily.
Recently, however, a consensus has been emerging among proponents of the Nostratic hypothesis. Greenberg in fact basically agreed with the Nostratic concept, though he stressed a deep internal division between its northern 'tier' (his Eurasiatic) and a southern 'tier' (principally Afroasiatic and Dravidian). The American Nostraticist Bomhard considers Eurasiatic a branch of Nostratic alongside other branches: Afroasiatic, Elamo-Dravidian, and Kartvelian. Similarly, Georgiy Starostin (2002) arrives at a tripartite overall grouping: he considers Afroasiatic, Nostratic and Elamite to be roughly equidistant and more closely related to each other than to anything else. Sergei Starostin's school has now re-included Afroasiatic in a broadly defined Nostratic, while reserving the term Eurasiatic to designate the narrower subgrouping which comprises the rest of the macrofamily. Recent proposals, thus, differ mainly on the precise placement of Dravidian and Kartvelian.

See also 
 Languages of Africa
 Afroasiatic languages
 Languages of Asia
 Nostratic languages
 Proto-Afroasiatic language
 Proto-Indo-European homeland
 History of the Middle East
 Prehistoric North Africa

References

Bibliography

 Barnett, William and John Hoopes (editors). 1995. The Emergence of Pottery. Washington, DC: Smithsonian Institution Press. 
 
 
 
 
 Dimmendaal, Gerrit, and Erhard Voeltz. 2007. "Africa". In Christopher Moseley, ed., Encyclopedia of the world's endangered languages.
 Ehret, Christopher. 1997. Abstract of "The lessons of deep-time historical-comparative reconstruction in Afroasiatic: reflections on Reconstructing Proto-Afroasiatic: Vowels, Tone, Consonants, and Vocabulary (U.C. Press, 1995)", paper delivered at the Twenty-fifth Annual Meeting of the North American Conference on Afro-Asiatic Linguistics, held in Miami, Florida on March 21–23, 1997.
 Finnegan, Ruth H. 1970. "Afro-Asiatic languages West Africa". Oral Literature in Africa, pg 558.
 Fleming, Harold C. 2006. Ongota: A Decisive Language in African Prehistory. Wiesbaden: Otto Harrassowitz.
 
 Greenberg, Joseph H. 1955. Studies in African Linguistic Classification. New Haven: Compass Publishing Company. (Photo-offset reprint of the SJA articles with minor corrections.)
 Greenberg, Joseph H. 1963. The Languages of Africa. Bloomington: Indiana University. (Heavily revised version of Greenberg 1955.)
 Greenberg, Joseph H. 1966. The Languages of Africa (2nd ed. with additions and corrections). Bloomington: Indiana University.
 Greenberg, Joseph H. 1981. "African linguistic classification." General History of Africa, Volume 1: Methodology and African Prehistory, edited by Joseph Ki-Zerbo, 292–308. Berkeley and Los Angeles: University of California Press.
 Greenberg, Joseph H. 2000–2002. Indo-European and Its Closest Relatives: The Eurasiatic Language Family, Volume 1: Grammar, Volume 2: Lexicon. Stanford: Stanford University Press.
 Hayward, R. J. 1995. "The challenge of Omotic: an inaugural lecture delivered on 17 February 1994". London: School of Oriental and African Studies, University of London.
 Heine, Bernd and Derek Nurse. 2000. African Languages, Chapter 4. Cambridge University Press.
 Hodge, Carleton T. (editor). 1971. Afroasiatic: A Survey. The Hague – Paris: Mouton.
 Hodge, Carleton T. 1991. "Indo-European and Afro-Asiatic." In Sydney M. Lamb and E. Douglas Mitchell (editors), Sprung from Some Common Source: Investigations into the Prehistory of Languages, Stanford, California: Stanford University Press, 141–165.
 Huehnergard, John. 2004. "Afro-Asiatic." In R.D. Woodard (editor), The Cambridge Encyclopedia of the World's Ancient Languages, Cambridge – New York, 2004, 138–159.
 Militarev, Alexander. "Towards the genetic affiliation of Ongota, a nearly-extinct language of Ethiopia," 60 pp. In Orientalia et Classica: Papers of the Institute of Oriental and Classical Studies, Issue 5. Moscow. (Forthcoming.)
 Newman, Paul. 1980. The Classification of Chadic within Afroasiatic. Leiden: Universitaire Pers Leiden.
 Ruhlen, Merritt. 1991. A Guide to the World's Languages. Stanford, California: Stanford University Press.
 
 Theil, R. 2006. Is Omotic Afro-Asiatic? Proceedings from the David Dwyer retirement symposium, Michigan State University, East Lansing, 21 October 2006.

Further reading

External links 
 Map of Afro-Asiatic languages from Roger Blench's website
 Family tree of Afro-Asiatic at Ethnologue.com
 Afro-Asiatic and Semitic genealogical trees, presented by Alexander Militarev at his talk "Genealogical classification of Afro-Asiatic languages according to the latest data" at the conference on the 70th anniversary of V.M. Illich-Svitych, Moscow, 2004; short annotations of the talks given there 
 A comparison of Orel-Stolbova's and Ehret's Afro-Asiatic reconstructions
 NACAL The North American Conference on Afroasiatic Linguistics.

Origin hypotheses of ethnic groups
Urheimat